Depending on the jurisdiction, de facto union may refer to:

 Common-law marriage, which is also called "marriage in fact"
 Civil union
 Unregistered cohabitation
 Domestic partnership

See also 
 De facto union in Portugal